John Michael Seasock (born July 3, 1965) is a retired professional monster truck driver. He competed on the USHRA circuit with his Batman truck, where it was the 2007 and 2008 Monster Jam World Racing Champion. He last drove Grinder sponsored by Advance Auto Parts.

Career
Seasock began his interest in monster trucks when he saw Bigfoot at the Philadelphia Spectrum.  In 1990 he became a full-time driver with his first Sudden Impact, a red Ford F-150 which was leaf-sprung.

In the middle of the 1990s, Seasock drove for several teams, including a stint in the Devil's Dodge truck, before buying the Storm Warning vehicle and renaming it to Sudden Impact. It was the first truck to sport the recognisable teal paint scheme.

He continued in that truck until 1999 when he purchased the Liquidator from Bob Fisher and also renamed it Sudden Impact.  This truck went through several revisions and paint schemes through its lifespan.  It also brought Seasock to stardom on the USHRA Monster Jam circuit, helping him receive four World Finals berths and become one of the more well-known truck/driver combinations in the series. He also worked as a part-time driver for Mike Welch Motorsports, driving Pirate Pete.

In 2004 Seasock's team became a part of Chiller Motorsports to form Sudden Impact Racing.  Seasock stepped aside from Sudden Impact and climbed into T-Maxx, splitting up a combination known to fans for many years.

Seasock returned to Sudden Impact for the 2006 winter season, but left the team in April.  He has since joined Live Nation, and had been driving various trucks for them, including Team Suzuki, El Toro Loco, and Inferno. For the 2007 winter season, he became the driver of Batman.  In this truck, Seasock scored the biggest win of his career as he won the 2007 Monster Jam Racing Championship.  In 2008, he repeated the feat, becoming only the second back-to-back racing champion.

Trademarks

Seasock's freestyles have a high rate of momentum but are more controlled and do not feature many unconventional hits.  Despite this, Seasock often relies on big jumps, slap wheelies and donuts to receive increasingly consistent high scores. Seasock's signature freestyle move is the "roof walk", which involves him standing on the roof of the truck and acknowledging the fans while the truck is still in motion.

Off the track, Seasock is very well known for his fan interaction, including attending weekly chat sessions on his team's website.  He is also an avid street bike rider.

Awards
Monster Truck Racing Association (MTRA) Sportsman of the Year: 1997, 1998, 2000
USHRA Sportsman of the Year: 2001
MTRA Most Improved Team: 1999
MTRA Safety Award: 2000
USHRA World Finalist: 2000, 2001, 2002, 2003, 2007, 2008, 2009, 2010
USHRA Monster Jam Racing Champion: 2007, 2008

References

External links
USHRA Driver Profile

Monster truck drivers
1965 births
Living people